Antioch University Santa Barbara (AUSB) is a private liberal arts university in downtown Santa Barbara, California. It is part of the Antioch University system that includes campuses in Keene, New Hampshire; Seattle, Washington; Los Angeles, California; and Yellow Springs, Ohio, also home to Antioch College. Antioch University has operated in Santa Barbara since 1977.

History 
Antioch College was established in 1852 in Yellow Springs, Ohio. Horace Mann, educator, social reformer, abolitionist, and one of the creators of the US public school system was its first president. Mann's goal, which he achieved, was to create a university that would be nonsectarian, coeducational, and that did not utilize a conventional grading system. In 1863, Antioch approved a policy that no applicant was to be rejected on the basis of race. It was also among the first colleges to offer the same curriculum to men and women students.

In 1963 the College began to expand out-of-state. A network of schools was begun. In 1977 Antioch College renamed itself Antioch University and opened the Santa Barbara campus that year.

Programs 
AUSB's programs include:

Bachelor of Arts (BA) in Liberal Studies completion program is perfect for transfer and returning students – with high transfer credit available. Students engage in a wide range of learning activities with academic work taking place in various environments including on-campus classes, schools, health agencies, art organizations, businesses, and other community settings. There are seven concentrations available: Applied Psychology; Business & Entrepreneurship; Child Development & Education; Communication & Media; Environmental Studies; Liberal Arts; and Marketing.

Master of Fine Arts (MFA) in Writing & Contemporary Media program empowers writers to succeed in the dynamic landscape of professional storytelling: film, television, stage, journalism, podcasting, and interactive media. The low-residency design combines the flexibility of online learning with collaborative campus residencies with faculty and peers in Santa Barbara’s beach setting. In addition, students have the opportunity to spend one selected semester working with faculty and students in the MFA in Creative Writing program at Antioch University Los Angeles campus.

Master of Business Administration (MBA) program in Social Business, Non-Profit Management, and Strategic Leadership is rooted in the philosophy that social responsibility and civic engagement are at the heart of transformative business practices. This 16-month low-residency, hybrid program meets one weekend per month with online courses in between. Students gain the tools to create highly ethical and success driven business culture that prioritizes strategic leadership and social awareness.

Master of Arts in Education (MA) or the more streamlined Master of Education (MEd) offer a unique and responsive education, where the learner actively constructs the knowledge, skills, and dispositions to take a leadership role in our schools and community. There are additional course work offerings, including a Teacher Credential Program, a Multiple-Subject Teaching Credential, a Social Justice and Educational Leadership Emphasis, a Nature-Based Childhood Education Emphasis, an Educational Specialist Mild/Moderate Credential, and an Educational Specialist Mild/Moderate Curriculum Design.

Master of Arts (MA) in Clinical Psychology program trains aspiring clinicians to work in a wide range of community and private practice settings. Students are prepared for MFT or LPCC licensure and may choose select one of two optional concentrations if they wish in Healthy Aging or Latino Mental Health, in order to serve two growing populations in need of support. The curriculum is designed so working students who enroll full-time can complete the coursework and clinical hours in two years.

Doctor of Clinical Psychology (PsyD) program’s practitioner-scholar model prepares students to use well-refined critical thinking skills, fine-tuned clinical knowledge, and application grounded in the kind of innovative and complex science that distinguishes a doctoral degree. Antioch PsyD students have the opportunity to integrate cutting-edge psychological training, theory, practice, and research, while sharpening and applying the skills of a true clinician – observation, analysis, intervention, and evaluation – for the benefit of their clients.

Women & Leadership Certificate program is a 10-month low-residency and virtual program that supports the career advancement of female leaders, building on a platform of self-knowledge, respect, confidence, and passion across professional and community contexts. The curriculum addresses the principles and practice of values-based leadership and gender in business, public/political, and non-profit venues. Designed as a leadership training and mentorship program, students are provided with a strong, collaborative foundation to succeed in important and meaningful leadership roles.

Students 
Students are primarily adults who are either returning to school or who are planning for career change. University policy states that it seeks "qualified candidates who will contribute to building a student body diverse in gender, ethnicity, age, class, physical differences, learning styles, sexual orientation, professional backgrounds, and community experiences." The University partners with AmeriCorps by matching up to $5,000 with its Segal Education Scholarship for service as an AmeriCorps graduate. The university caters to an increasing number of international students.

Faculty 
There are more than 100 core and adjunct members of the faculty. Many work part-time for the university and spend the majority of their time working in their fields and professions. Barbara Lipinski, PhD, JD is the
Provost and Chief Executive Officer.

References

External links 
Antioch University Santa Barbara website

Antioch University
Buildings and structures in Santa Barbara, California
Universities and colleges in Santa Barbara County, California
Educational institutions established in 1977
Schools accredited by the Western Association of Schools and Colleges
1977 establishments in California
Private universities and colleges in California